Thomas Joseph Grady (October 9, 1914April 21, 2002) was an American prelate of the Roman Catholic Church. He was the second bishop of the Diocese of Orlando in Florida from 1974 to 1989, having previously served as an auxiliary bishop of the Archdiocese of Chicago in Illinois from 1967 to 1974.

Biography

Early life and education
Thomas Grady was born on October 9, 1914, in Chicago, Illinois, the son of a police captain, Michael Grady, who twice arrested Al Capone. He attended Archbishop Quigley Preparatory Seminary in Chicago and St. Mary of the Lake Seminary in Mundelein, Illinois.

Ordination and ministry
On April 23, 1938, Grady was ordained to the priesthood for the Archdiocese of Chicago by Cardinal George Mundelein. Grady studied in Rome for a year before returning to Chicago.  He earned a Master of Arts degree in English from Loyola University in 1944. Grady then taught at Archbishop Quigley and later joined the faculty of St. Mary of the Lake, serving as procurator. 

In 1956, Grady was appointed director of the National Shrine of the Immaculate Conception in Washington, D.C., the largest Catholic church in the United States. As director, Grady oversaw a period of massive construction for the church, assuming his position just as building resumed after a 20-year hiatus. He worked with builders and architects to oversee the cladding of its interior and exterior with limestone and marble, the addition of 26 side chapels, the completion of the "Christ in Majesty" mosaic, the installation of a massive pipe organ, and a 56-bell carillon. Shortly after the 1963 assassination of President John F. Kennedy, he celebrated a Mass for President Lyndon B. Johnson using a gold and bejeweled "Texas chalice".

Auxiliary Bishop of Chicago
On June 21, 1967, Grady was appointed auxiliary bishop of the Archdiocese of Chicago and titular bishop of Vamalla by Pope Paul VI. He received his episcopal consecration on August 24, 1967, from Cardinal John Cody, with Bishops Cletus F. O'Donnell and Aloysius John Wycislo serving as co-consecrators. As an auxiliary bishop, he served as vicar general of the archdiocese, started the permanent diaconate program, and headed the Archdiocesan Liturgy Committee.

Bishop of Orlando
Following the transfer of Bishop William Borders to the Archdiocese of Baltimore, Grady was appointed the second bishop of the Diocese of Orlando by Paul VI on November 11, 1974. He was installed  on December 16 of that year.

During his 15-year tenure in Orlando, Grady guided the diocese through a period of significant growth. He oversaw the establishment 18 new parishes, a tourism ministry, the San Pedro Spiritual Development Center on the shores of Lake Howell, and a Mission Office to forge a relationship with a sister diocese.  This Sister Diocese is the  Diocese of San Juan de la Maguana in the Dominican Republic. He expanded ministries to migrants and minorities, founded a scholarship program for African American students, and helped develop apartment buildings for the elderly. He also wrote a weekly column called "The Bishop's Corner" for the Florida Catholic weekly newspaper.

Retirement and death
After reaching the mandatory retirement age of 75, Grady resigned on December 12, 1989. He later died from a kidney ailment at his home in Altamonte Springs, Florida, at age 87 on April 21, 2002.

Awards and honors
In his capacity as director of the National Shrine of the Immaculate Conception, Grady was directly involved in all aspects surrounding the purchase, installation, consecration, and dedication of its 56-bell carillon. As a result, The Guild of Carillonneurs in North America awarded him permanent, honorary membership in 1964.

References

Episcopal succession

1914 births
2002 deaths
Clergy from Chicago
University of Saint Mary of the Lake alumni
Loyola University Chicago alumni
Roman Catholic bishops of Orlando
20th-century Roman Catholic bishops in the United States
21st-century Roman Catholic bishops in the United States
Catholics from Illinois